The Swift 017.n was the sole racing car for the Super Formula (formerly: Formula Nippon) between 2009 and 2013. The initial FN09 version was upgraded for the 2013 season dubbed SF13.

History
After many years of Lola Cars competition in Formula Nippon a new chassis was needed for the 2009 season. As early as 2007 American company Swift Engineering, headed by former Japanese racing driver Hiro Matsushita, was selected to provide the new racing car to all teams. The Swift 017.n was designed by Swift Engineering chief designer Chris Norris. Dutch engineer Casper van der Schoot was the program director. The car was initially intended to compete as of 2009 through 2011, however the run of the race car was extended through 2013.

The racecar was characterized by the distinctive exterior appearance. The dual wing design of the front wing and rearwing provided the car with 750 kg of downforce (in combination with the diffuser). The car made its race debut at Fuji Speedway on April 5, 2009. Kohei Hirate scored the pole position as Benoît Tréluyer won the race.

FT5000
In April 2016 it was revealed that the Swift 017.n chassis was chosen as the base chassis for a new race series, Formula Thunder 5000. The series is intended to race in New Zealand and Australia, resembling the former Tasman Series. New-Zealander Chris Lambden purchased one chassis from Swift Engineering as a prototype for the series. The rolling chassis was fitted with a 5.0L Ford Coyote V8 engine. Michael Borland, of Borland Racing Developments, purchased the molds and drawings to build additional chassis fitted to the FT5000 specifications. The modifications included a modified front wing and heightened air box to more resemble the former Formula 5000.

Statistics
A total of 24 Swift 017.n chassis were built. In Formula Nippon 39 races were run with the American built chassis.

Best laps

Gallery

References

Open wheel racing cars
Super Formula cars
Swift Engineering vehicles